Aymard Fabrice Moro-Mvé  (born 1 June 1987 in Libreville) is a Gabonese footballer is currently playing for SC Feignies.

Career 
Moro-Mvé began his career 1998 with SCO Roubaix and was after two years in summer 2000 scouted from ES Wasquehal. After only one year with ES Wasquehal signed in July 2001 a youth contract with OSC Lille. In 2006 was promoted to the reserve from OSC Lille, played 45 games and scores 2 goals. On 30 May 2009 K.V. Mechelen have signed the left-back from OSC Lille until June 2011. and in September 2011 signed for SC Feignies.

International 
Moro-Mvé first call for Gabon was on 23 February 2008 and played his first game in April 2008 against DR Congo national football team.

References

External links
 

1987 births
Living people
Gabonese footballers
Gabon international footballers
Lille OSC players
Gabonese expatriates in Belgium
Wasquehal Football players
Association football defenders
Entente Feignies Aulnoye FC players
Expatriate footballers in France
Sportspeople from Libreville
Expatriate footballers in Belgium
K.V. Mechelen players
Gabonese expatriates in France
SR Colmar players
21st-century Gabonese people